The FIBA Europe Men's Player of the Year Award was an annual official FIBA Europe award for the Player of the Year (POY), that was inaugurated in the year 2005, and bestowed until 2014. The winner was a basketball player who had European citizenship, and whose performances with his sports club and/or national team throughout the year had reached the highest level of excellence. All players with European citizenship, regardless of where they played in the world, qualified for the award, including NBA players. Players did not have to play in any FIBA competitions in order to be eligible.

The winner received the prize, after winning a vote of both fans and a panel of basketball experts, media members, and coaches, from twenty five countries. Consequently, the legitimacy of the award was somewhat higher than Superbasket magazine's old Mister Europa Award, Gazzetta dello Sport's Euroscar Award, and Eurobasket.com's All-Europe Player of the Year award, which did not, or still do not include the fan vote. That being specified, the importance of the former awards relies on their tradition, as their inception occurred in 1976, 1979, and 2002 respectively. All in all, the laureates are often the same on all four lists, with all of them representing many of the biggest European basketball stars since the mid-1970s.

Winners 

If a winner played for more than one club team in the calendar year of his award, all teams are listed in chronological order.

FIBA Europe Men's Players of the Year

See also 
 FIBA Europe Young Men's Player of the Year Award
 Euroscar
 Mr. Europa
 EuroLeague MVP
 EuroLeague Final Four MVP

References

External links 
FIBAEurope.com Player of the Year Award

FIBA Europe
European basketball awards
Awards established in 2005
Awards disestablished in 2014